Sally Anne Wainwright  (born 1963) is an English television writer, producer, and director from Yorkshire. Early in her career, Wainwright worked as a playwright, and as a scriptwriter on the long-running radio serial drama The Archers. In the 1990s, Wainwright began her television career, and, in 2000, created her first original drama series At Home with the Braithwaites (2000–2003).

She won the Royal Television Society's Writer of the Year Award for the 2009 mini-series Unforgiven. Wainwright is known for her creation of the ITV drama series Scott & Bailey (2011–2016), Last Tango in Halifax (2012–2020), and Happy Valley (2014–2023). Last Tango in Halifax won the British Academy Television Award for Best Drama Series in 2013, whilst Happy Valley won the same award in both 2015 and 2017.

Wainwright is the creator of the 2019 HBO and BBC One television series Gentleman Jack starring Suranne Jones as Anne Lister and Sophie Rundle as Ann Walker.

Early life 
Wainwright was born in 1963 in Huddersfield, West Yorkshire, to Harry Wainwright and Dorothy Wainwright (née Crowther). Wainwright was brought up in Sowerby Bridge, where she attended Triangle Church of England Primary School and Sowerby Bridge High School. She attended the University of York, reading English and Related Literature. She has an older sister, Diane Hilton.

Wainwright said that she had always wanted to write, and had started writing when she was young, from the time she was nine years old, and wanted to write for Coronation Street. She said that when she was 16 years old in 1980 she saw a play called Bastard Angel by playwright Barrie Keeffe at the Royal Shakespeare Company and was deeply interested in its short sentences and naturalistic approach to dialogue.

Career 
While at the University of York, Wainwright took an original play called Hanging On to the Edinburgh Festival and found an agent, Meg Davis, for her writing in the process. Meanwhile, she worked as a bus driver. When she was 24, she left the driving job after she started writing for the Radio 4 series The Archers. One of her contributions was to write an atypical story for the long-running radio soap in which the village shop was robbed. After that she wrote for Coronation Street, developing her writing skills, from 1994 to 1999. She has since said that working on continuing drama was "a great education in discipline and a lesson that great stories are hard work". She was mentored by Kay Mellor, who encouraged her to stop writing for soaps and to concentrate instead on original work. She created the TV series At Home with the Braithwaites about a woman who had secretly won the lottery. The programme was nominated for multiple awards. In 2006, she wrote the drama series Jane Hall, which depicts the life of a female bus driver in London. Wainwright drew on her own experiences in scripting the series.

She won the 2009 Writer of the Year Award given by the RTS in 2009 for Unforgiven, which took several awards including best TV series.

Wainwright says that her strong yet flawed female characters are "almost real" to her and arrive "fully formed" in her imagination. She likes to control the television that is created and has done some directing and producing of her own work, partly to ensure the scenery and dialogue reflects Yorkshire.

In 2011, she wrote Scott & Bailey, a series about two female police officers. The idea for the series came from the actresses Suranne Jones and Sally Lindsay and former Detective Inspector Diane Taylor, who assisted with bringing the series to air.

Wainwright based the plot of her series Last Tango in Halifax on the story of her mother, who was widowed in 2001. Her mother, Dorothy, moved to Oxfordshire to live with her daughter and rediscovered a lost love via Friends Reunited. With her mother's permission, Wainwright developed the story of how she remarried so rapidly, showing extracts from the series to her mother before broadcast.

When she told the story to Nicola Shindler, she suggested she turn her mother's experience into a television series. Shindler became the series' executive producer. Both Last Tango in Halifax and her crime series Scott & Bailey were turned down by both the BBC and ITV before being accepted retrospectively. The former was voted by BAFTA to be best series in 2012 and Wainwright was given the award for best writer.

Happy Valley, which was shot in Yorkshire's upper Upper Calder Valley and Hebden Bridge, stars Sarah Lancashire, whom Wainwright had in mind as she wrote the role. Wainwright made her directorial debut with episode 4 of the first series. Wainwright had previously said that she was willing to write a third series of Happy Valley, but had commitments to work on other projects, and in 2016 producer Nicola Shindler indicated that the third series would not air until 2018 at the earliest. In 2022 it was announced that a third series would debut on 1 January 2023. The final episode was broadcast on 5 February 2023.

In 2016, Wainwright was made a Fellow of the Royal Television Society.

Wainwright wrote and directed a two-hour drama special for BBC One entitled To Walk Invisible: The Bronte Sisters, which aired on BBC One in 2016 and in the US in 2017. Its subject is the Brontë family, particularly the relationship the three sisters, Anne, Emily and Charlotte, had with their brother, Branwell. While working on the drama, Wainwright said "I am thrilled beyond measure that I've been asked by the BBC to bring to life these three fascinating, talented, ingenious Yorkshire women."

In 2019, Wainwright's Gentleman Jack, a drama about the 19th-century Yorkshire landowner, diarist, and open lesbian, Anne Lister, played by Suranne Jones, and Lister's courtship of Ann Walker, played by Sophie Rundle, premiered on both BBC One in the UK and HBO in the US.

Personal life 
Wainwright, who lives in Oxfordshire, is married to Ralph "Austin" Sherlaw-Johnson, an antiquarian sheet music dealer, son of the composer, pianist, and music scholar Robert Sherlaw Johnson. They have two sons and own two Maine Coon cats.

Wainwright was appointed Officer of the Order of the British Empire (OBE) in the 2020 Birthday Honours for services to writing and television.

Wainwright has said that she is potentially autistic and that social interaction is quite painful for her.

Credits

Television

Other 
 1986–1988: The Archers (Radio show: BBC Radio 4) − Writer (2 years)
 2000: Emily Brontë's Lover (Radio show: BBC Radio 4) − Writer
 Hanging On (play)

Honours 
 2003: Best Short Drama Banff Festival for The Wife of Bath's Tale
 2009: RTS Awards, Best Drama Serial for Unforgiven
 2011: RTS North West Awards, Best Writer for Scott & Bailey
 2013: Sky WFTV Awards, Technicolor Writing Award
 2013: BAFTA TV Craft Awards, Best Drama Writer
 2013: BAFTA TV Craft Awards, Best Drama Series for Last Tango in Halifax
 2014: Broadcast Awards, Best Drama Series for Happy Valley
 2014: British Screenwriters’ Awards, Best British TV Drama Writing for Happy Valley
 2014: Crime Thriller Awards, Best TV Series for Happy Valley
 2014: TV Choice Awards, Best New Drama for Happy Valley
 2015: Broadcasting Press Guild Awards, Best Drama Writer
 2015: BAFTA TV Craft Awards, Best Drama Writer
 2015: Edgar Allan Poe Awards, Best Television Episode for Happy Valley (episode 1)
 2015: WGGB Awards, Best Long Form TV Drama for Happy Valley
 2015: Edinburgh TV Awards, Best Programme of the year for Happy Valley
 2015: BAFTA Awards, Best Drama Series for Happy Valley
 2017: RTS Programme Awards, Best Drama Writer for Happy Valley
 2017: RTS Programme Awards, Judges' Award
 2017:BAFTA Awards, Best Drama Series for Happy Valley
 2017: BAFTA TV Craft Awards, Best Drama Writer for 'Happy Valley' 
 2020: Royal Television Society Awards, Best Drama Series Winner for 'Gentleman Jack'
 2020: Freedom of The Borough of Calderdale 
 2020: Officer of the Order of the British Empire (OBE) in the 2020 Birthday Honours for services to Writing and Television.

References

External links 
 
 

Living people
English television writers
British women television writers
English soap opera writers
The Archers
Alumni of the University of York
People from Sowerby Bridge
Women soap opera writers
20th-century British women writers
BAFTA winners (people)
York University alumni
Edgar Award winners
British television producers
English television directors
Fellows of the Royal Television Society
Officers of the Order of the British Empire
WFTV Award winners
British women television producers
1963 births
20th-century English screenwriters
21st-century British women writers
21st-century British screenwriters
British women television directors